Michael John Rumbles (born 10 June 1956) is a former Scottish Liberal Democrat politician.  He served as a Member of the Scottish Parliament (MSP) for North East Scotland, from 2016 to 2021. He previously represented West Aberdeenshire and Kincardine before being defeated at the 2011 election in the successor constituency of Aberdeenshire West).

Background
Rumbles was born in South Shields in England and was educated at St James School in Hebburn, County Durham, Sunderland Polytechnic where he graduated with a BEd, and Royal Military Academy Sandhurst. He served in the Royal Army Education Corps retiring as a Major in October 1994.

Rumbles obtained an MSc in economics at Aberystwyth University and he studied at the University of Leicester where he completed a PGD in Employment Law.

Career
Rumbles was elected to the West Aberdeenshire and Kincardine constituency in the 1999 election, and comfortably held the seat in the 2003 election and 2007 election but was defeated by the SNP in 2011. Following the Scottish Parliament's establishment in 1999, Rumbles was Convenor of the Standards Committee when it was charged with investigating the so-called 'Lobbygate' scandal, in which the son of the then Secretary of State for Scotland John Reid was embroiled.  He promoted the legislation to establish an independent Standards Commissioner, the first Committee Bill of the Parliament.

Leadership contests
On 12 May 2005, Rumbles announced his intention to stand for the vacant post of leader of the Scottish Liberal Democrats. His candidacy involved a distinct platform from his opponent Nicol Stephen. In particular, he specified a number of 'deal-breakers' for any coalition negotiations that might occur in the aftermath of the 2007 Scottish Parliament elections, with an absolute insistence on the implementation of key Liberal Democrat policies such as abolition of the council tax, and an enhancement of the Scottish Parliament's powers.  He also aimed to give the Liberal Democrats a more equal status within the coalition. He lost to Stephen in June 2005, winning 23.4% of the vote.

On 2 July 2008, following Stephen's surprise resignation as leader, Rumbles again announced his intention to stand for the Scottish Liberal Democrat leadership. This time he stressed his commitment to reviewing party policy on whether to hold a national referendum on Scottish independence (the policy of the Scottish National Party government). In the contest he faced former Ministers Ross Finnie and Tavish Scott. Scott won the contest comfortably.

Personal life
Rumbles married Pauline Sillars in 1985. They have two sons.

References

External links 
 
 Mike Rumbles profile on Scottish Liberal Democrats website

1956 births
Living people
People from South Shields
Politicians from Tyne and Wear
Alumni of the University of Sunderland
Graduates of the Royal Military Academy Sandhurst
Liberal Democrat MSPs
Members of the Scottish Parliament 1999–2003
Members of the Scottish Parliament 2003–2007
Members of the Scottish Parliament 2007–2011
Members of the Scottish Parliament 2016–2021
Royal Army Educational Corps officers
Alumni of Aberystwyth University
Alumni of the University of Leicester
Military personnel from County Durham
20th-century British Army personnel